The 1991 Currie Cup Central B was the third division of the Currie Cup competition, the premier domestic rugby union competition in South Africa. This was the 53rd season since the competition started in 1889.

Teams

Changes between 1990 and 1991 seasons
 The 1990 season was the last edition of the Currie Cup Division B. Instead, the second tier was changed to a Currie Cup Central Division, which had a four-team Division A and a four-team Division B.
  were promoted from the 1990 Santam Bank Trophy to the Central B Division.

Changes between 1991 and 1992 seasons
  were initially relegated from 1991 Currie Cup Central A to 1992 Currie Cup Central B. However, following the merger of all rugby governing bodies in South Africa,  were dissolved and  retained their place in Currie Cup Central A. Currie Cup Central B was reduced to five teams for 1992.
  were promoted from the Central B to 1992 Currie Cup Central A.

Competition

There were six participating teams in the 1991 Currie Cup Central B competition. These teams played each other twice over the course of the season, once at home and once away. Teams received two points for a win and one points for a draw. The winner of the Central B competition played off against the winner of the Central A competition for the Bankfin Cup.

In addition, all the Currie Cup Central B teams also played in the 1991 Currie Cup Central / Rural Series.

Log

Fixtures and results

Round one

Round two

Round three

Round four

Round five

Round six

Round seven

Round eight

Round nine

Round ten

Round eleven

Round twelve

Round thirteen

Final

The winner of the Central B competition played off against the winner of the Central A competition for the Bankfin Cup.

Promotion play-offs

As a result of the play-offs,  were promoted to the 1992 Currie Cup Central A competition, while  were relegated to the 1992 Currie Cup Central B competition.

See also
 1991 Currie Cup
 1991 Currie Cup / Central Series
 1991 Currie Cup Central A
 1991 Currie Cup Central / Rural Series
 1991 Currie Cup Rural C
 1991 Currie Cup Rural D
 1991 Lion Cup

References

B